Juha Valtanen (born 6 December 1952) is a Finnish sailor. He competed in the Tornado event at the 1984 Summer Olympics.

References

External links
 

1952 births
Living people
Finnish male sailors (sport)
Olympic sailors of Finland
Sailors at the 1984 Summer Olympics – Tornado
Sportspeople from Helsinki